Jay Randall Ross (born October 3, 1987) is an American football nose tackle. He was signed as an undrafted free agent by the New Orleans Saints in 2010. He played college football at East Carolina University.

Professional career

New Orleans Saints
Following the conclusion of the 2010 NFL Draft on April 26, 2010, the New Orleans Saints signed Ross to a contract. Ross was released by the team during the final roster cuts prior to the start of the season on September 4, 2010.

Green Bay Packers
Ross was signed to the Green Bay Packers' practice squad on October 20, 2010.

References

External links
Green Bay Packers
New Orleans Saints bio

1987 births
Living people
American football defensive tackles
East Carolina Pirates football players
Sportspeople from Wilmington, North Carolina
Players of American football from North Carolina
New Orleans Saints players
Buffalo Bills players
Green Bay Packers players